The Palestinian ambassador in Rome is the official representative of the Palestinian government to the Government of Italy.

List of representatives

References 

Italy
Palestine
Ambassadors of the State of Palestine to Italy